"Man of Constant Sorrow" (also known as "I Am a Man of Constant Sorrow") is a traditional American folk song first published by Dick Burnett, a partially blind fiddler from Kentucky.  The song was originally titled "Farewell Song" in a songbook by Burnett dated to around 1913. A version recorded by Emry Arthur in 1928 gave the song its current titles.

Several versions of the song exist that differ in their lyrics and melodies. The song was popularized by the Stanley Brothers, who recorded the song in the 1950s; many other singers recorded versions in the 1960s, most notably by Bob Dylan. Variations of the song have also been recorded under the titles of "Girl of Constant Sorrow" by Joan Baez and by Barbara Dane, "Maid of Constant Sorrow" by Judy Collins, and "Sorrow" by Peter, Paul and Mary. It was released as a single by Ginger Baker's Air Force with vocals by Denny Laine.

Public interest in the song was renewed after the release of the 2000 film O Brother, Where Art Thou?, where it plays a central role in the plot, earning the three runaway protagonists public recognition as the Soggy Bottom Boys. The song, with lead vocal by Dan Tyminski, was featured on the film's highly successful, multiple platinum-selling soundtrack.  That recording won a Grammy for Best Country Collaboration at the 44th Annual Grammy Awards in 2002.

Origin

The song was first published in 1913 with the title "Farewell Song" in a six-song songbook by Dick Burnett, titled Songs Sung by R. D. Burnett—The Blind Man—Monticello, Kentucky. There exists some uncertainty as to whether Dick Burnett is the original writer. In an interview he gave toward the end of his life, he was asked about the song:

Whether or not Burnett was the original writer, his work on the song can be dated to about 1913. The lyrics from the second verse—'Oh, six long year I've been blind, friends'—would hold true with the year he was blinded, 1907. Burnett may have tailored an already existing song to fit his blindness, and some claimed that he derived it from "The White Rose" and "Down in the Tennessee Valley" circa 1907. Burnett also said he thought he based the melody on an old Baptist hymn he remembered as "Wandering Boy". According to hymnologist John Garst, though, no song with this or a similar title had a tune that can be identified with "Constant Sorrow". Garst nevertheless noted that parts of the lyrics suggest a possible antecedent hymn, and that the term 'man of sorrows' is religious in nature and appears in Isaiah 53:3. The song has some similarities to the hymn "Poor Pilgrim," also known as "I Am a Poor Pilgrim of Sorrow," which George Pullen Jackson speculated to have been derived from a folk song of English origin titled "The Green Mossy Banks of the Lea".

Emry Arthur, a friend of Burnett's, released a recording of the song in 1928, and also claimed to have written it. Arthur titled his recording "I Am a Man of Constant Sorrow", the name that the song came to be more popularly known. The lyrics of Burnett and Arthur are very similar with minor variations. Although Burnett's version was recorded earlier in 1927, Columbia Records failed to release Burnett's recording; Arthur's single was thus the earliest recording of the song to be released, and the tune and lyrics of Arthur's version became the source from which most later versions were ultimately derived.

Several similar songs were found in Kentucky and Virginia in the early 20th century. English folk-song collector Cecil Sharp collected four versions of the song in 1917–1918 as "In Old Virginny", which were published in 1932 in English Folk Songs from the Southern Appalachians. The lyrics were different in details from Burnett's, but similar in tone. In a version from 1918 by Mrs Frances Richards, who probably learned it from her father, the first verse is nearly identical to Burnett and Arthur's lyrics, with minor changes like Virginia substituting for Kentucky. The song is thought to be related to several songs such as "East Virginia Blues". Norman Lee Vass of Virginia claimed his brother Mat wrote the song in the 1890s, and the Virginia versions of the song show some relationship to Vass's version, though his melody and most of his verses are unique. This variant was thought to be influenced by "Come All You Fair and Tender Ladies"/"The Little Sparrow".

An older version described by Almeda Riddle was dated to around 1850, but with texts that differ substantially after the first line.  John Garst traced elements of the song back to the hymns of the early 1800s, suggesting similarity in its tune to "Tender-Hearted Christians" and "Judgment Hymn", and similarity in its lyrics to "Christ Suffering", which included the lines "He was a man of constant sorrow / He went a mourner all his days."

On October 13, 2009, on the Diane Rehm Show, Ralph Stanley of the Stanley Brothers, whose autobiography is titled Man of Constant Sorrow, discussed the song, its origin, and his effort to revive it:

Lyrical variations
Many later singers have put new and varied lyrics to the song. Most versions have the singer riding a train fleeing trouble, regretting not seeing his old love, and contemplating his future death, with the promise that he will meet his friends or lover again on the beautiful or golden shore. Most variants start with similar lines in the first verse as the 1913 Burnett's version, some with variations such as gender and home state, along with some other minor changes:

The 1928 recording by Emry Arthur is largely consistent with Burnett's lyrics, with only minor differences. However, the reference to blindness in the second verse of Burnett's lyrics, "six long year I've been blind", had been changed to "six long years I've been in trouble", a change also found in other later versions that contain the verse.

In around 1936, Sarah Ogan Gunning rewrote the traditional "Man" into a more personal "Girl".  Gunning remembered the melody from a 78-rpm hillbilly record (Emry Arthur, 1928) she had heard some years before in the mountains, but the lyrics she wrote were considerably different from the original after the first verse.  The change of gender is also found in Joan Baez's "Girl of Constant Sorrow" and another variant of the song similar to Baez's, Judy Collins's title song from her album A Maid of Constant Sorrow.

In 1950, the Stanley Brothers recorded a version of the song they had learned from their father.  The Stanley Brothers' version contains some modifications to the lyrics, with an entire verse of Burnett's version removed, the last line is also different, and 'parents' of the second verse have turned into 'friends'.  The performances of the song by the Stanley Brothers and Mike Seeger contributed to the song's popularity in the urban folksong circles during the American folk music revival of the 50s and 60s.

Bob Dylan recorded his version in 1961, which is a rewrite based on versions performed by other folk singers such as Joan Baez and Mike Seeger.  A verse from the Stanleys' version was removed, and other verses were significantly rearranged and rewritten. Dylan also added personal elements, changing 'friends' to 'mother' in the line 'Your mother says that I'm a stranger' in reference to his then-girlfriend Suze Rotolo's mother. In Dylan's version, Kentucky was changed to Colorado; this change of the state of origin is common, for example, Kentucky is changed to California in "Girl of Constant Sorrow" by Joan Baez and "Maid of Constant Sorrow" by Judy Collins.

Aside from the lyrics, significant variations also exist in the melody of the song in many of these versions.

Recordings and cover versions

Burnett recorded the song in 1927 with Columbia; this version was unreleased and the master recording destroyed.  The first commercially released record was by Emry Arthur, on January 18, 1928. He sang it while playing his guitar and accompanied by banjoist Dock Boggs. The record was released by Vocalion Records (Vo 5208) and sold well, and he recorded it again in 1931. As the first released recording of the song, its melody and lyrics formed the basis for subsequent versions and variations.  Although a few singers had also recorded the song, it faded to relative obscurity until The Stanley Brothers recorded their version in 1950 and helped popularize the song in the 1960s.

The use of the song in the 2000 film O Brother, Where Art Thou? led to its renewed popularity in the 21st century. The song has since been covered by many singers, from the Norwegian girl-group Katzenjammer to the winner of the eighth season of The Voice Sawyer Fredericks.

Stanley Brothers

On November 3, 1950, the Stanley Brothers recorded their version of the song with Columbia Records at the Castle Studios in Nashville. The Stanleys learned the song from their father Lee Stanley who had turned the song into a hymn sung a cappella in the Primitive Baptist tradition.  The arrangement of the song in the recording however was their own and they performed the song in a faster tempo.  This recording, titled "I Am a Man of Constant Sorrow", was released in May 1951 together with "The Lonesome River" as a single (Columbia 20816).  Neither Burnett nor Arthur copyrighted the song, which allowed Carter Stanley to copyright the song as his own work.

On September 15, 1959, the Stanley Brothers re-recorded the song on King Records for their album Everybody's Country Favorite. Ralph Stanley sang the solo all the way through in the 1950 version, but in the 1959 version, he was joined by other members of the band in added refrains. The fiddle and mandolin of the early version were also replaced by guitar, and a verse was omitted.  This version (King 45-5269) was released together with "How Mountain Girls Can Love" as a single that October 1959.

In July 1959, the Stanley Brothers performed the song at the Newport Folk Festival, which brought the song to the attention of other folk singers. It led to a number of recordings of the song in the 1960s, most notably by Joan Baez (1960), Bob Dylan (1961), Judy Collins (1961), and  Peter, Paul and Mary (1962).

Bob Dylan
In November 1961 Bob Dylan recorded the song, which was included as a track on his 1962 eponymous debut album as "Man of Constant Sorrow".  Dylan's version is a rewrite of the versions sung by Joan Baez, New Lost City Ramblers (Mike Seeger's band), and others in the early 1960s.  Dylan also performed the song during his first national US television appearance, in the spring of 1963.  Dylan's version of the song was used by other singers and bands of 1960s and 70s, such as Rod Stewart and Ginger Baker's Air Force.

Dylan performed a different version of the song that is a new adaptation of Stanleys' lyrics in his 1988 Never Ending Tour. He performed the song intermittently in the 1990s, and also performed it in his European tour in 2002. A performance was released in 2005 on the Martin Scorsese PBS television documentary on Dylan, No Direction Home, and on the accompanying soundtrack album, The Bootleg Series Vol. 7: No Direction Home.

Ginger Baker's Air Force

The song  was recorded in 1970 by Ginger Baker's Air Force and sung by Air Force guitarist and vocalist (and former Moody Blues, future Wings member) Denny Laine. The single was studio recorded, but a live version, recorded at the Royal Albert Hall, was included in their eponymous 1970 debut album. The band used a melody similar to  Dylan's, and for the most part also Dylan's lyrics (but substituting 'Birmingham' for 'Colorado'). The arrangement differed significantly, with violin, electric guitar, and saxophones, although it stayed mainly in the major scales of A, D and E. It was the band's only chart single.

Charts

Soggy Bottom Boys

A notable cover, titled "I Am a Man of Constant Sorrow", was recorded by the fictional folk/bluegrass group The Soggy Bottom Boys from the film O Brother, Where Art Thou?. The producer T Bone Burnett had previously suggested the Stanley Brothers' recording as a song for The Dude in the Coen brothers' film The Big Lebowski, but it did not make the cut. For their next collaboration, O Brother, Where Art Thou?, he realized that the song would suit the main character well. The initial plan was for the song to be sung by the film's lead actor, George Clooney; however, it was found that his recording was not up to the required standard. Burnett later said that he had only two or three weeks to work with Clooney, which was not enough time to prepare Clooney for the recording of a credible hit country record.

The song was recorded by Dan Tyminski  (lead vocals), with Harley Allen and Pat Enright, based on the Stanleys' version. Tyminski also wrote, played, and changed the guitar part of the arrangement.  Two versions by Tyminski were found in the soundtrack album, with different backup instruments. In the film, it was a hit for the Soggy Bottom Boys, and would later become a real hit off-screen. Tyminski has performed the song at the Crossroads Guitar Festival with Ron Block and live with Alison Krauss.

The song received a CMA Award for "Single of the Year" in 2001 and a Grammy for "Best Country Collaboration with Vocals" in 2002.  The song was also named Song of the Year by the International Bluegrass Music Association in 2001.  It peaked at No. 35 on Billboard's Hot Country Songs chart.  It has sold over a million copies in the United States by November 2016.

Personnel 
Source:

 Banjo – Ron Block
 Bass – Barry Bales
 Dobro – Jerry Douglas
 Fiddle – Stuart Duncan
 Guitar – Chris Sharp
 Harmony vocals – Harley Allen, Pat Enright
 Lead vocals, guitar – Dan Tyminski
 Mandolin – Mike Compton
 Arranged by – Carter Stanley

Charts

Others
 1920s – American Delta blues artist Delta Blind Billy in his song "Hidden Man Blues" had the line 'Man of sorrow all my days / Left the home where I been raised.'
 1937 – Alan Lomax recorded Sarah Ogan Gunning's performance of her version, "I Am a Girl of Constant Sorrow", for the Library of Congress's  Archive of American Folk Song.  Her version was also covered by other singers such as Peggy Seeger (her melody however is more similar to Arthur's version), Tossi Aaron, and Barbara Dane. She recorded the song again at the 1964 Newport Folk Festival, and also released a recording in her album, Girl of Constant Sorrow, in 1965.
 1947 – Lee and Juanita Moore's performance at a radio station WPAQ was recorded and later released in 1999. They were granted a new copyright registration in 1939 for their treatment of the song.
 1960 – A version of the song, "Girl of Constant Sorrow", was recorded by Joan Baez in the summer of 1960.  This version was left off the original release of her debut album Joan Baez in 1960 on the Vanguard label, but was included as a bonus track on the 2001 CD-reissue version of the album.  Baez has also recorded "Man of Constant Sorrow" with no change in gender.
 1961 – Judy Collins's 1961 debut album, A Maid of Constant Sorrow, took its name from a variant of the song which was included on the album.
 1961 – Roscoe Holcomb recorded a version.
 1962 – It appears on Mike Seeger's album Old Time Country Music, Folkways FA 2325.  Mike Seeger recorded three versions of the song.
 1962 – in their 1962 self-titled debut album, Peter, Paul and Mary recorded another version as "Sorrow".
 1966 – It was recorded by Waylon Jennings on his 1966 major-label debut Folk-Country.
 1969 – Rod Stewart covered the song in his debut solo album.  It was based on Dylan's version but with his own arrangement.
 Cambodian singer Pan Ron recorded a Khmer version where local instruments such as the three-stringed tro replaced the violins of Stanley Brothers' recording to created distinctive Cambodian version.
 1972 – An a cappella version appears on The Dillards' 1972 LP Roots and Branches.  This version had only two verses and replaced Kentucky with Missouri.
 1993 – "Man of Constant Sorrow" was one of many songs recorded by Jerry Garcia, David Grisman, and Tony Rice one weekend in February 1993. Jerry's taped copy of the session was later stolen by his pizza delivery man, eventually became an underground classic, and finally edited and released in 2000 as The Pizza Tapes.                                   
2003 - Skeewiff "Man of Constant Sorrow" was ranked 96 in the Triple J Hottest 100, 2003, released on Volume 11 disk 1 track 20.
2012 - Charm City Devils released "Man Of Constant Sorrow" which charted on various Billboard rock charts - No. 25 on Mainstream Rock Songs No. 22 on Active Rock, and No. 48 on Hot Rock Songs.
2015 – Dwight Yoakam covered the song in his album Second Hand Heart. Yoakam's rendition has been described as having a 'rockabilly' sound.
 2015 – Blitzen Trapper covered the song exclusively for the black comedy–crime drama television series Fargo, which played over the credits of the "Rhinoceros" episode of the second season.
 2018 – Home Free, covered the song in a country / a capella style. It was released also on their album Timeless.
2021 - In the Channel 4 sitcom We Are Lady Parts, the main character, Amina, sings a variation of the song with the lyrics changed to fit her situation.

Parodies
In 2002, Cledus T. Judd recorded a parody titled "Man of Constant Borrow" with Diamond Rio on his album Cledus Envy.

References

Further reading

External links
  Contains lyrics for Burnett's and the 1950 Stanley Brothers' versions 
  Lyrics for Bob Dylan's 1961 recording and Stanley Brothers' 1959 version from Newport Folk Festival

Year of song unknown
Songwriter unknown
1913 songs
2000 singles
American folk songs
Peter, Paul and Mary songs
Bob Dylan songs
Rod Stewart songs
The Stanley Brothers songs
Songs about Kentucky